Jack Norris (born 1967) is an American dietitian and animal rights activist. He is Executive Director of Vegan Outreach, which he co-founded, in 1993, with Matt Ball. He designed Vegan Outreach's Adopt A College program which began in 2003 and  ran until March of 2020. He now oversees Vegan Outreach's 10 Weeks to Vegan program.

Early life and education
Norris graduated from Archbishop Moeller High School in Cincinnati, Ohio in 1985. He attended Cornell College in Mount Vernon, Iowa, receiving a B.A. in Philosophy and Sociology in 1989.

He earned a Bachelor of Science degree in Nutrition and Dietetics from Life University (Marietta, Georgia) in 2000 and performed his dietetic internship at Georgia State University in 2000–2001.

Career
Norris, a vegan, is a registered dietitian. He was an American Council on Exercise-certified personal trainer from 1994 to 1996.

Norris is the author of Vitamin B12: Are You Getting It?, Tips for New Vegans, and Daily Needs [for vegans].

Norris pioneered and ran Vegan Outreach's Adopt A College program which ran from 2003 to 2020. This consisted of vegan advocates handing Vegan Outreach's booklets on the reason to be vegetarian or vegan to over 21 million students at 4,677 schools. When Vegan Outreach's Adopt A College program ended in March of 2020 due to the pandemic, Norris expanded Vegan Outreach's online 10 Weeks to Vegan program. In 2020, over 250,000 people registered for the program and in 2021 over 460,000 people registered. The program  has different versions for 40 countries, with new versions being added about once a month.

Honors and awards
Norris won VegNews magazine's Columnist of the Year award for 2003 and 2004.

In 2005, Norris was elected to the Animal Rights Hall of Fame.

Norris is one of several people who provided information used in the writing of the book Striking at the Roots: A Practical Guide to Animal Activism (2008) by Mark Hawthorne.

Personal life
Norris married vegan chef Alex Bury on September 11, 2008, in front of a KFC restaurant in Toronto, Canada. After the wedding, the guests were served vegan sandwiches that KFC had recently introduced to the public. Norris lives in St. Petersburg, Florida.

Publications

See also

Animal protectionism
Vegan nutrition
 List of animal rights advocates

Notes

External links

VeganOutreach.org
VeganHealth.org

1967 births
Living people
American veganism activists
Dietitians
People from Cincinnati
People from Davis, California
Cornell College alumni
Life University alumni
Plant-based diet advocates